North Shore High School can refer to:

North Shore High School, school in Cleveland, Ohio Cuyahoga County, Ohio
North Shore High School (Glen Head, New York)
North Shore High School (North Dakota) in Makoti, North Dakota
North Shore Senior High School (Texas) in Harris County, Texas, near Houston
Northshore High School in Slidell, Louisiana
North Shore High School, a fictitious high school, located in Evanston, Illinois, in the film Mean Girls
North Shore High School, a former high school in Palm Beach County, Florida